Tetramorium kutteri is a species of ant in the genus Tetramorium. It is endemic to Spain.

References

kutteri
Hymenoptera of Europe
Endemic insects of the Iberian Peninsula
Endemic fauna of Spain
Insects described in 1990
Taxonomy articles created by Polbot
Taxobox binomials not recognized by IUCN